Torben Engelking (born 28 June 1996) is a German footballer who plays as a left winger for Regionalliga Nord club TSV Havelse.

Career
Engelking made his professional debut for TSV Havelse in the 3. Liga on 14 January 2022 against MSV Duisburg, coming on in the 78th minute as a substitute for Nils Piwernetz.

References

External links
 
 
 
 

1996 births
Living people
People from Stadthagen
Footballers from Lower Saxony
German footballers
Association football midfielders
1. FC Germania Egestorf/Langreder players
TSV Havelse players
3. Liga players
Regionalliga players